Ayusman Sen is a professor of chemistry at Pennsylvania State University. His specialties are nanomotors, catalysis, and new materials.

He received a $25,000 award in 1984 from the Alfred P. Sloan Foundation.

He has explained what he calls his own "irrational interest" in science with a quote from Henry Moore: "The secret of life is to have a task, something you devote your entire life to, something you bring everything to, every minute of the day for the rest of your life. And the most important thing is, it must be something you cannot possibly do."

References 

Pennsylvania State University faculty
Year of birth missing (living people)
Place of birth missing (living people)
Living people